Nina Tassler is an American television executive and producer. She was most recently the chairwoman of CBS Entertainment until 2015.

Life and career
Tassler was born in New York City to a Jewish father and a Puerto Rican mother who converted to Judaism. She was the highest profile Latina in network television and one of the few executives who had the power to greenlight series. Her boss was Nancy Tellem, President, CBS Paramount Network Television Entertainment Group. Tassler oversaw CBS' prime time, late night and daytime programming, as well as program development for all genres.

Tassler grew up in upstate New York and eventually graduated from Boston University (bachelor of fine arts in theater). After college, she moved to New York City and worked for Roundabout Theatre Co. After a few years, she moved to Los Angeles. There, she worked as a talent agent at Triad Artists for about 5 years before moving on to Warner Brothers.

Tassler joined CBS in August 1997 as VP Drama, CBS Productions, before moving to the network as SVP Drama Development in 1998, then becoming President of Entertainment in 2004 and chairman in 2014.

Filmography
How To Be Successful Without Hurting Men's Feelings
Ways & Means

Awards/nominations
 1997 - Distinguished Service to the Profession, a Boston University Distinguished Alumni award
 2005 - Creative Achievement Award, Imagen Foundation Awards.
 2007 - Television Showman of the Year, Publicists Guild of America.
 2013 - Career Achievement Award, Casting Society of America.
 2018 - Top Latino Leaders, National Diversity Council.
 The Most Powerful and Influential Latinos in Entertainment by The Imagen Foundation in 2011 and 2013 and 2015

Other positions
Executive Vice President, Drama Series Development, CBS Entertainment (July 2003 -September 2004)
Senior Vice President, Drama Development, CBS Entertainment (1998- July 2003)
Vice President, Drama, CBS Productions (August 1997 - 1998)
Vice President, Drama Development, Warner Bros. Television (199? - 1997)
Director, Movies and Mini-Series, Lorimar/Warner Bros. Television (1990- ?)

Personal life
Tassler is married to actor/director Jerry Levine, who is also a graduate of Boston University. They have two children.

See also

List of Puerto Ricans
Jewish immigration to Puerto Rico

References

External links
washingtonpost.com

American Jews
American people of Puerto Rican descent
American television executives
American women in business
Boston University College of Fine Arts alumni
Paramount Global people
CBS executives
Women television executives
Presidents of CBS Entertainment
Living people
Businesspeople from New York City
Year of birth missing (living people)